Richard Schultz (born 25 May 1949) is a South African former cricketer. He played in thirteen first-class and three List A matches for Boland in 1980/81 and 1981/82.

See also
 List of Boland representative cricketers

References

External links
 

1949 births
Living people
South African cricketers
Boland cricketers
People from Oudtshoorn
Cricketers from the Western Cape